The A 5 road is an A-Grade trunk road in Sri Lanka. It connects the Peradeniya with Chenkalady.

It is also known as "PBC Highway", a shortened term for Peradeniya-Badulla-Chenkalady.

The A 5 passes through Geli Oya, Gampola, Pussellawa, Nuwara Eliya, Keppetipola, Welimada, Hali-Ela, Badulla, Passara, Lunugala, Bibile, Padiyathalawa, Maha Oya, Thumpalancholai and Karadiyanaru to reach Chenkalady.

A05 highway
Transport in Eastern Province, Sri Lanka